Pongsiree Bunluewong (born 9 November 1984) is a Thai equestrian. He competed in the individual eventing at the 2004 Summer Olympics.

References

External links
 

1984 births
Living people
Pongsiree Bunluewong
Pongsiree Bunluewong
Equestrians at the 2004 Summer Olympics
Place of birth missing (living people)
Asian Games medalists in equestrian
Equestrians at the 2002 Asian Games
Pongsiree Bunluewong
Medalists at the 2002 Asian Games
Pongsiree Bunluewong